Isted or Idstedt is a village in Schleswig-Holstein, Germany.

Isted may also refer to:
Battle of Isted (1850), part of the First Schleswig War

People with the surname
John Isted, 19th century English cricketer
John Isted (MP) (fl. 1523–1557), English politician and MP for Hastings